The Balu is a left tributary of the river Lotru in Romania. It discharges into Vidra Lake, which is drained by the Lotru.

References

Rivers of Romania
Rivers of Vâlcea County